The White Horse is a grade II listed public house in Green Street, Brimsdown, Enfield.

References

External links

Enfield, London
Pubs in the London Borough of Enfield
Grade II listed pubs in London